Hans-Werner Moser (born 24 September 1965, in Kusel) is a German football coach and former player who manages 1. FC Kaiserslautern II.

References

1965 births
Living people
German footballers
Association football midfielders
Germany under-21 international footballers
Bundesliga players
2. Bundesliga players
1. FC Kaiserslautern players
Hamburger SV players
SG Wattenscheid 09 players
SC Verl players
German football managers
3. Liga managers
SC Westfalia Herne managers
SV Darmstadt 98 managers
1. FC Kaiserslautern managers